Kurt Steven Angle (born December 9, 1968) is an American retired professional wrestler, Olympic gold medalist in American freestyle wrestling, and former collegiate wrestler. He is best known for his tenures in WWE and Total Nonstop Action Wrestling (TNA).

While at Clarion University of Pennsylvania, Angle won numerous accolades, including being a two-time NCAA Division I Wrestling Champion in the heavyweight division. After graduating from college, Angle won the gold medal in freestyle wrestling at the 1995 World Wrestling Championships. He then won the freestyle wrestling gold medal at the 1996 Summer Olympics with a broken neck. He is one of four people to complete an amateur wrestling Grand Slam (Junior Nationals, NCAA, World Championships, and Olympics). In 2006, he was named by USA Wrestling as the greatest shoot wrestler ever and one of the top 15 college wrestlers of all time. He was inducted into the International Sports Hall of Fame in 2016 for his amateur accomplishments.

Angle made his first appearance at a pro-wrestling event in 1996, and signed with the World Wrestling Federation (later renamed WWE) in 1998. Noted for his rapid comprehension of the business, he had his debut match that August within the company's developmental system after mere days of training, and participated in his first televised WWF storyline in March 1999. After months of dark matches, Angle made his televised in-ring debut in November and received his first major push in the company in February 2000, when he held the European and Intercontinental Championships simultaneously. Four months later, he won the 2000 King of the Ring tournament and soon thereafter began pursuing the WWF Championship, which he won in October. Among other accomplishments in the WWF/E, Angle has held the WWF/WWE Championship four times, the WCW Championship once, and the World Heavyweight Championship once. He is the tenth Triple Crown Champion and the fifth Grand Slam Champion (achieving this accolade twice under both the original and current format) in WWE history. On March 31, 2017, Angle was inducted into the WWE Hall of Fame.

After leaving WWE in 2006, Angle joined Total Nonstop Action Wrestling (TNA – now Impact Wrestling) where he became the inaugural and record six-time TNA World Heavyweight Champion, and the second Triple Crown winner in TNA history (as well as the only one to hold all required titles at once). Angle is also a two-time King of the Mountain. As part of TNA, he made appearances for New Japan Pro-Wrestling (NJPW) and the Inoki Genome Federation (IGF), holding the IWGP Heavyweight Championship once. In 2013, Angle was inducted into the TNA Hall of Fame: he is the second wrestler, after Sting, to be inducted into both the WWE and Impact Halls of Fame.

Between WWF/WWE, Japan and TNA, Angle has won 21 total championships and overall is a 13-time world champion. He is the only pro-wrestler in history to have won the WWE Championship, WWE's World Heavyweight Championship, the WCW Championship, the TNA World Heavyweight Championship and IWGP Heavyweight Championship. Angle is also the only person to have been King of the Ring (WWE) and King of the Mountain (TNA), and the first to have held both the WWE and TNA Triple Crowns. He has headlined numerous pay-per-view events for WWF/WWE and TNA, including WrestleMania XIX and Bound for Glory on three occasions, the flagship events of the respective companies. In 2004, the Wrestling Observer Newsletter inducted Angle into its Hall of Fame and later named him "Wrestler of the Decade" for the 2000s. He is considered one of the biggest stars of the Attitude Era and one of the greatest professional wrestlers of all time. Former opponent and industry veteran John Cena said of Angle's legacy within WWE: "He is, without question, the most gifted all-around performer we have ever had step into a ring. There will never be another like him."

Early life 
Angle was born in the Pittsburgh suburb of Mt. Lebanon Township, Pennsylvania, the son of Jackie and David Angle. He attended Clarion University of Pennsylvania, graduating with a degree in education in 1993. Angle has four older brothers (one of whom, Eric, is also a wrestler) and a sister, Le'Anne, who died in 2003. His father, a crane operator, was killed in a construction accident when Angle was 16, and Angle dedicated both his career and his autobiography to his father. Angle stated in an interview that, following the death of his father, he regarded his wrestling coach, David Schultz, as a paternal figure. While training Angle, Schultz was murdered in January 1996 by John Eleuthère du Pont, the sponsor of Schultz's team of Olympic prospectives. Angle's mother died of cancer in 2015. He is of Italian, Irish, English, German, and Lithuanian descent.

Wrestling career 
Kurt Angle started amateur wrestling at the age of seven. He attended Mt. Lebanon High School, where he won varsity letters in football and wrestling and was an All-State linebacker. He went undefeated on the freshman wrestling team and qualified for the state wrestling tournament his sophomore year. Angle also placed third in the state wrestling tournament as a junior and was the 1987 Pennsylvania State Wrestling Champion as a senior.

Upon graduating from high school, Angle attended Clarion University of Pennsylvania, where he continued to wrestle at an amateur level. He was a two-time National Collegiate Athletic Association Division I champion, national runner-up in 1991, and a three-time NCAA Division I All-American. In addition, Angle was the 1987 USA Junior Freestyle champion, a two-time USA Senior Freestyle champion, and the 1988 USA International Federation of Associated Wrestling Styles Junior World Freestyle champion.

After graduating from college, Angle continued to wrestle. In 1995, he won a gold medal at the FILA Wrestling World Championships in Atlanta, Georgia. Following this victory, Angle began preparing for the 1996 Summer Olympics (also in Atlanta) under Dave Schultz at the Pennsylvanian Foxcatcher Club, training between eight and ten hours a day. In January 1996, not long after Angle began training at the club, Schultz was murdered by John Eleuthère du Pont, the sponsor of Schultz's team of Olympic prospectives. As a result, Angle quit du Pont's team, searched for new sponsors, and joined the Dave Schultz Wrestling Club in Schultz's memory.

Angle faced further hardships while taking part in the 1996 Olympic Trials, when he suffered a severe neck injury, fracturing two of his cervical vertebrae, herniating two discs, and pulling four muscles. Nonetheless, Angle won the trials and then spent the subsequent five months resting and rehabilitating. By the Olympics, Angle was able to compete, albeit with several pain-reducing injections in his neck. In the fall of 1996, Angle stated that he temporarily became addicted to the analgesic Vicodin after injuring his neck. He won his gold medal in the heavyweight (90–100 kg; 198–220 lb) weight class despite his injury, defeating the Iranian Abbas Jadidi by officials' decision after the competitors wrestled to an eight-minute, one-one draw. The bout saw Jadidi earn a point after two minutes and 42 seconds by turning Angle, and Angle earning a point of his own with a takedown after three minutes and four seconds. The officials' decision was protested by Jadidi. Angle dedicated the victory to Schultz's honor.

In April 2011, Angle revealed that he was planning a comeback to amateur wrestling for the 2012 Summer Olympics in London. In April 2012, he announced he was unable to make the trials for the US team due to a knee injury, though he held an honorary title as team manager.

In 2016, Angle was announced as an inductee into the International Sports Hall of Fame for his amateur wrestling accomplishments.

Professional wrestling career

Extreme Championship Wrestling (1996) 
On October 26, 1996, Angle was convinced by fellow Pittsburgh native Shane Douglas to attend the Extreme Championship Wrestling (ECW) event High Incident. He gave an in-ring interview and provided guest commentary during a match between Taz and Little Guido, but left the building after Raven "crucified" a bleeding Sandman by attaching him to a cross using barbed wire. Angle, shocked by the controversial imagery and afraid that his career prospects were going to be damaged if he was associated with the incident, threatened to sue ECW owner Paul Heyman if he was shown on television in the same broadcast as the stunt.

World Wrestling Federation/Entertainment (1998–2006)

Development Territorries (1998–1999) 
As a celebrated amateur wrestler, Angle had an aversion to professional wrestling, considering it "beneath" him. He was offered a 10-year contract with the World Wrestling Federation following the 1996 Olympics, but talks fell apart when he told company chairman Vince McMahon that he would be unwilling to lose any matches. Angle's opinion of professional wrestling changed when he began watching the WWF's Monday Night Raw in 1998: he observed "world class athletes doing very athletic things", and developed an admiration for Stone Cold Steve Austin's talents as an entertainer. Angle later conceded that his negative attitude toward the industry was misguided and "stupid".

With the WWF's original 1996 offer now rescinded, Angle had a tryout with the company, and was signed to a five-year deal by August 1998: the contract offer came three days after his tryout. He trained under Dory Funk Jr., with whom the WWF had developed the Funkin' Dojo training camp in Stamford, Connecticut, and began wrestling in front of a live audience in under a week. Angle's first match took place within WWF developmental territory the World Wrestling Alliance (WWA) on August 20, in a losing effort against his other trainer, Tom Prichard. He wrestled multiple matches for the WWA in August and September, and solicited bookings outside of the WWF, participating in a battle royal won by Dr. Death Steve Williams at the National Wrestling Alliance's (NWA) 50th Anniversary Show on October 24, and performing for Pennsylvania Championship Wrestling (PCW) and the East Coast Wrestling Association (ECWA) in February 1999.

In March, Angle began wrestling regularly for the WWF's Power Pro Wrestling (PPW) developmental league in Memphis, Tennessee. His first appearance on WWF television was on the March 7 episode of Sunday Night Heat, where he took part in an angle with Tiger Ali Singh. This angle involved Singh paying Angle money to blow his nose on the American flag. Angle instead blew his nose on Singh's flag and fought him off. His first WWF match was a dark match victory over Brian Christopher on April 11. In the following months, Angle wrestled on house shows and in other dark matches in preparation for his televised debut. He faced against Owen Hart in a dark match on Shotgun Saturday Night just two weeks before Owen died. Owen won the match. He also continued to wrestle for PPW through October and on July 24 won the PPW Championship. Angle then lost the championship to Steve Bradley on August 7. He is noted for learning the art of pro wrestling quicker than almost anyone else; WWE executive and former opponent Triple H described Angle as "probably the fastest guy I've ever seen pick this business up", owing to "phenomenal" athleticism and an "aptitude" for the industry.

Debut and Intercontinental and European Champion (1999–2000)

After several weeks of vignettes, Angle made his televised WWF in-ring debut on November 14 at Survivor Series at the Joe Louis Arena in Detroit, Michigan, defeating Shawn Stasiak. He began using The Patriot's theme "Medal" (also used once by Sgt. Slaughter) for his ring entrance, which became associated with Angle for the rest of his career. In his initial push, he remained undefeated for several weeks, eventually losing to the debuting Tazz by passing out at the Royal Rumble. Angle's television character was an "American hero" gimmick based on his gold medal win at the 1996 Summer Olympics. In his promos, Angle presented himself as a role model and stressed the need to work hard to realize one's dreams, stressing the 3 Is, "Intensity, Integrity and Intelligence". In his promos and ring entrances, Angle always wore replicas of his gold medals around his neck. While he stood for many principles that are associated with faces, Angle was noticeably booed in his debut match and even the next night on Raw Is War in his match against The Godfather, which took place in his hometown of Pittsburgh. The fans in general did not react positively to his billing as the first "real athlete" in the WWF, which ultimately led to him being portrayed as a heel, talking down to the audience and behaving as though he was better than the fans and fellow wrestlers, usually taunting them with the question of, "Where are your gold medals?"

Angle won both the European Championship and the Intercontinental Championship in February 2000. He then lost both of his titles without ever conceding a fall in a two falls Triple Threat match with Chris Benoit and Chris Jericho at WrestleMania 2000.

 WWF Champion (2000–2001) 

Throughout mid-2000, after aligning himself with Edge & Christian, "Team ECK" (Edge, Christian, and Kurt) feuded with Too Cool and Rikishi, with Angle defeating Rikishi in the finals of the 2000 King of the Ring tournament. He went on to feud with Triple H after a love triangle between them and Triple H's wife, Stephanie McMahon, developed. As a change to the intended storyline of Stephanie turning on her husband and going with Angle, he lost to Triple H at Unforgiven. Before the match started, however, he bumped into a returning Stone Cold Steve Austin, who was looking for the perpetrator who ran him over at the previous year's Survivor Series. Angle offered him his friendship and one of his gold medals, but Austin was not pleased by telling him that he would keep it in a nice safe place, to which Austin referred to "right up his ass" before attacking Angle and throwing his medal to the floor.

Following his feud with Triple H, Angle received another push and began pursuing the WWF Championship, defeating The Rock at No Mercy, after botched interference on The Rock's behalf from Rikishi. With his victory over The Rock, Angle became the first wrestler to have won both an Olympic gold medal and the world championship. Angle retained the WWF Championship for the rest of the year in matches with The Undertaker at Survivor Series and in a six-man Hell in a Cell match at Armageddon. After beating Triple H at the Royal Rumble, Angle eventually lost the title to The Rock at No Way Out.

Angle then feuded with Chris Benoit whom he defeated at WrestleMania X-Seven, but lost to him at Backlash in an Ultimate Submission match; Benoit defeated Angle four falls to three in sudden-death overtime. Continuing the feud, Angle again defeated Benoit in a two out of three falls match at Judgment Day. Benoit pinned Angle after an Angle Slam in a "Pinfalls Only" fall, and then Angle made Benoit submit with the ankle lock in the "Submissions Only" fall. Angle won the third fall, a ladder match, with the help of Edge and Christian.

 Grand Slam winner (2001–2002) 

When World Championship Wrestling (WCW) and ECW were purchased by the WWF, the wrestlers from both promotions joined and formed The Alliance and invaded the WWF in mid-2001 (dubbed as "The Invasion"). As a result, Angle turned face and began a storyline where he joined forces with WWF Champion Stone Cold Steve Austin to repel them. At Invasion, Angle and Austin captained a team of five WWF superstars against five handpicked members of the Alliance. As part of the angle, Team WWF lost to Team Alliance when Austin turned on his team to join The Alliance. At the close of the match, Austin nailed Angle with a Stone Cold Stunner, causing him to get pinned by Booker T. After winning and losing the WCW Championship, WCW United States Championship and the WWF Hardcore Championship in matches with Alliance members, Angle defeated Austin in a SummerSlam rematch to win his second WWF Championship at Unforgiven. Angle proposed Vince McMahon to win the title after the September 11 attacks, since he had a patriotic character and thought the fans needed a positive message.

Angle dropped the title back to Austin on the October 8 episode of Raw when WWF Commissioner William Regal joined The Alliance and cost Angle the match. On the October 29 episode of Raw, Angle subsequently turned heel again and joined The Alliance himself; during a WrestleMania X-Seven rematch between Vince McMahon and Shane McMahon, he interfered seemingly to aid Vince, but instead struck the members of team WWF with a steel chair. Angle later ultimately returned to the WWF side by enabling The Rock to defeat Austin in a "Winner Takes All" match between the WWF and The Alliance at Survivor Series. He remained a heel by claiming sole responsibility for the destruction of The Alliance.
 
At Vengeance, Angle lost to Stone Cold Steve Austin, who was the WWF Champion, as part of a one-night tournament to unify the WWF and World titles also involving Chris Jericho and The Rock. On January 20, 2002, Angle entered his first ever Royal Rumble match at the Royal Rumble, where he lasted until the final two before being eliminated by eventual winner Triple H. At No Way Out, Angle defeated Triple H, with assistance from special referee Stephanie McMahon, for the right to face the Undisputed WWF Champion at WrestleMania X8, but lost the title shot right back to him the next night on Raw.   Angle briefly feuded with Kane, defeating him at WrestleMania X8.  On the March 25 episode of Raw, Angle was drafted to the SmackDown! brand as part of the 2002 WWF draft lottery.

Angle then reignited his feud with Edge, defeating him at Backlash. The naturally balding Angle lost a "hair versus hair" match to Edge at Judgment Day, and his head was shaved bald. Angle once again lost to Edge in a steel cage match on the May 30 episode of SmackDown!, concluding their feud. After the match, Edge's tag partner Hollywood Hulk Hogan attacked Angle and tried to strip of him of his wig, but Angle fled before he could do so. Angle later scored a submission victory over Hogan at King of the Ring, making him the first wrestler in WWE history to defeat Hogan via submission. During mid-2002, Angle routinely held open challenges on SmackDown!. Accepting one of these challenges, John Cena made his WWE televised debut on the June 27 taping of SmackDown!, losing to Angle after a roll-up pin. On the July 4 episode of SmackDown!, Angle faced WWE Undisputed Champion The Undertaker, which ended in controversial finish, with Angle locking Undertaker in a triangle choke, the referee counted Angle's shoulders down as the Undertaker tapped out and the bell was rung despite the referee not having given the signal to do. This confusion caused the match to be labeled a draw. At Vengeance, Angle received his rematch as he competed in a triple-threat match against Undertaker and The Rock for the championship, which he lost after being pinned by the Rock. Angle picked up a win against a newly debuted Rey Mysterio at SummerSlam.

In September, Angle started to feud with Chris Benoit, losing to him at Unforgiven. On the October 3 taping of SmackDown!, Angle and Benoit were teamed together by SmackDown! general manager Stephanie McMahon to compete in a tournament to determine the inaugural WWE Tag Team Champions. Angle became the fifth WWE Grand Slam Champion when he and Benoit won at No Mercy, defeating Edge and Rey Mysterio. The match between the four men at No Mercy was named the 2002 Match of the Year by Wrestling Observer Newsletter. Their team was successful, but problematic as the two bickered constantly, with Benoit often fed up with Angle's over-the-top antics. They made their first successful title defense by defeating Los Guerreros (Eddie Guerrero and Chavo Guerrero) at Rebellion. Their reign ended after they dropped the titles to Edge and Mysterio on the November 7 episode of SmackDown! in a two-out-of-three falls match. Angle and Benoit would receive another shot at the WWE Tag Team Championship in a triple threat elimination match against Edge and Mysterio and Los Guerreros at Survivor Series, but failed after they were the first team eliminated; Los Guerreros eventually won.

WWE Champion and Team Angle (2002–2004)

Angle won his third WWE Championship at Armageddon by defeating Big Show with the help of Brock Lesnar. While still in his third reign, Angle began a new storyline when he gained the services of manager Paul Heyman and "Team Angle" (Charlie Haas and Shelton Benjamin) on the December 26 episode of SmackDown!. Then SmackDown! General manager Stephanie McMahon announced that Big Show would face Chris Benoit that night to determine who would face Angle for the title at the Royal Rumble. Benoit pinned Big Show to win the match. After the match Angle and Big Show brutally attacked Benoit. At the Royal Rumble, Angle defeated Benoit to retain the WWE Championship by forcing him to submit the ankle lock. He then began feuding with Brock Lesnar, who had won the 2003 Royal Rumble match. Angle lost the WWE Championship in the main event of WrestleMania XIX to Lesnar, due to needing time off to recuperate from injuries. On April 11, 2003, Angle underwent neck surgery performed by Dr. Hae-Dong Jho to repair nerve and spinal damage, calcium buildup, bone spurs, and intervertebral disc problems. Rather than have Dr. Jho remove the afflicted discs and fuse his vertebrae together, Angle opted for a less conventional surgery where Jho removed only the spurs and selected portions of the discs. The alternative surgery reduced Angle's rehabilitation time from one year to three months.

Angle returned as a face on the June 5 episode of SmackDown!. Shortly after returning, Angle defeated Lesnar and Big Show in a triple threat match at Vengeance to regain the WWE Championship for the fourth time. During this time, Lesnar seemed to become an ally to Angle. Lesnar, however, secretly worked with Vince McMahon on a plot against Angle, turning on him during a steel cage match on the August 7 episode of SmackDown! between Lesnar and McMahon in which Angle was the special guest referee, and stated that he never tolerated losing the belt to him at Vengeance. After retaining the championship against Lesnar at SummerSlam by making him submit to the ankle lock, he lost the title to Lesnar in a 60-Minute Iron Man match on the September 18 episode of SmackDown!. Angle then formed a five-man team to rival Lesnar's team at Survivor Series, with Angle's team coming out victorious, despite Angle being eliminated by Lesnar.

Angle then got involved in a feud with Eddie Guerrero. He was initially being a firm friend and ally to Eddie during the latter's feud with his nephew Chavo. At No Way Out Guerrero defeated Lesnar to win the WWE Championship, while Angle defeated John Cena and Big Show in a triple threat match to become the number one contender for Guerrero's title at WrestleMania XX. On the February 19 episode of SmackDown!, Angle attacked Guerrero while serving as special guest referee for his WWE Championship match with Chavo Guerrero, turning heel once again. After losing to Guerrero at WrestleMania, Angle began to once again suffer from legitimate neck problems and went in for surgery on his neck shortly after WrestleMania and was not scheduled to return to action for some time. On the March 25 episode of SmackDown!, Angle was made the on-screen General Manager of SmackDown!, with his absence from the ring attributed to injuries suffered after Big Show chokeslammed him off a ledge on the April 15 episode of SmackDown!. Angle continued his feud with Guerrero throughout 2004. He cost Guerrero the WWE Championship against John "Bradshaw" Layfield (JBL) in a Texas Bull Rope match at The Great American Bash by participating in the worked finish; Angle came down to the ring and showed a replay where JBL's shoulder hit the corner pad before Guerrero's hand. Angle was later fired by Vince McMahon as General Manager on the July 22, 2004 episode of SmackDown! after McMahon discovered that he was faking his handicapped status and put him in a match against Eddie Guerrero at SummerSlam. At SummerSlam, Angle defeated Guerrero by submission. On the September 9 episode of SmackDown!, Angle fought Guerrero in a lumberjack match that ended in a no contest when a brawl broke out and Big Show then made his return, attacking both Angle and Guerrero. This led to a match at No Mercy where Angle lost to Big Show.

On the November 4, 2004, episode of SmackDown!, during an unscripted segment of Tough Enough, Angle challenged the finalists to a squat thrust competition. Chris Nawrocki won the competition, and the prize Nawrocki won was a match against Angle. Angle quickly took Nawrocki down with a guillotine choke, but Nawrocki managed to make it to the ropes, forcing Angle to break the hold. Angle then took Nawrocki down with a double leg takedown, legitimately breaking his ribs. Angle then locked another guillotine choke on Nawrocki, pinning him in the process. After Angle defeated Nawrocki, Angle challenged the other finalists. Daniel Puder, an American professional mixed martial artist, accepted Angle's challenge. Angle and Puder wrestled for position, with Angle taking Puder down, however, in the process, Puder locked Angle in a kimura lock. With Puder on his back and Angle's arm locked in the kimura, Angle pushed Puder's shoulders down, pinning him and one of two referees in the ring, Jim Korderas, quickly counted three to end the bout, despite the fact that Puder's shoulders were not fully down on the mat, bridging up at two. Puder later claimed he would have snapped Angle's arm on national television if Korderas had not ended the match. Dave Meltzer and Dave Scherer gave these following comments:

 "The Wrestling Machine" (2005–2006) 

At the Royal Rumble, after failing to win a triple threat match for the WWE Championship, involving Big Show and champion John "Bradshaw" Layfield (JBL), Angle later took part in the Royal Rumble match itself, but was eliminated in quick fashion by Shawn Michaels, causing Angle to return to the ring to eliminate Michaels in retaliation. After mocking Michaels by defeating his former tag team partner, Marty Jannetty, and attacking former manager, Sherri Martel, Angle defeated Michaels in an inter-promotional match at WrestleMania 21, which won the Pro Wrestling Illustrated (PWI) Match of the Year award. On the April 14 episode of SmackDown!, Angle defeated Eddie Guerrero as part of a tournament to determine the number one contender to the WWE Championship. In the same episode, Angle confronted fellow tournament entrant Booker T and his wife Sharmell after Sharmell predicted that Booker would win the tournament. On the April 21 episode of SmackDown!, Angle and John "Bradshaw" Layfield interfered in a tournament match between Booker and Big Show, rendering it a no-contest and thus creating a fatal four-way match against the remaining tournament entrants the next week, which JBL won. Over the ensuing weeks, Angle sexually harassed Sharmell, including a segment where Angle claimed that he wanted to have "bestiality sex" with Sharmell. In another, he claimed that Sharmell had "molested" him and "fondled his privates". At Judgment Day, Booker defeated Angle. On the June 2 episode of SmackDown!, Angle defeated Booker and Sharmell in a 2-on-1-handicap match after pinning Sharmell in a sexual position. Angle would again lose to Booker on the June 9 episode of SmackDown!, ending their feud. Angle appeared at ECW One Night Stand as an anti-ECW "crusader". At the end of ECW One Night Stand, Angle and other "crusaders" would engage in a brawl with ECW alumni led by Steve Austin, in which the crusaders were soundly beaten.

Angle resumed his feud with Michaels upon being drafted to the Raw brand in the 2005 WWE draft lottery, losing to Michaels at Vengeance. On the July 25, 2005 episode of Raw, Eugene took part in the "Kurt Angle Invitational" challenge. Angle was unable to make Eugene submit in the three-minute limit, winning his cherished Olympic gold medal (per match stipulation), and starting a feud between the two. The feud culminated at SummerSlam, where Angle defeated Eugene to regain his medal. Angle later feuded with John Cena for the WWE Championship. He challenged Cena at Unforgiven, but won by disqualification, therefore not winning the title. On the October 3 WWE Homecoming episode of Raw, he wrestled rival Shawn Michaels to a 2–2 draw in a 30-Minute Iron Man match, after which Michaels challenged him for a sudden death overtime, but Angle refused and walked out. He challenged Cena for the WWE Championship again in a triple threat match involving Michaels at Taboo Tuesday, but lost, and then again lost to Cena at Survivor Series. Angle would continue his feud with Cena into 2006, defeating him in a non-title first blood match on the January 2 episode of Raw, after interference from Daivari. At New Year's Revolution, Angle again challenged Cena for the title, this time in an Elimination Chamber match, also involving Shawn Michaels, Kane, Carlito and Chris Masters. Angle would fail to win the match, as he was eliminated by Michaels.

On the January 13 episode of SmackDown!, Angle returned to the SmackDown! brand as a surprise entrant in a twenty-man battle royal for the vacant World Heavyweight Championship. Angle won by last eliminating Mark Henry, turning face in the process. He retained the title against Henry at the Royal Rumble. Shortly after the match, The Undertaker made his return and challenged Angle for the title. At No Way Out, Angle retained the title against Undertaker after a controversial finish where Angle pinned Undertaker while locked in a triangle choke. Their match was highly acclaimed, with it being considered by many to be one of the best of the year. Undertaker challenged Angle to a rematch on the March 3 episode of SmackDown!, where Angle lost by disqualification after Mark Henry interfered and attacked Undertaker. This ensured that Angle would enter WrestleMania 22 as champion. Angle then began a three-way feud with Royal Rumble winner Rey Mysterio and Randy Orton (who cheated to defeat Mysterio at No Way Out to gain entrance to the SmackDown! main event at WrestleMania). At WrestleMania, Angle lost the World Heavyweight Championship to Mysterio in the triple threat match after Mysterio pinned Orton.

On the May 29 episode of Raw, Angle was drafted to the newly created ECW brand. It was during this time that he acquired the nickname "The Wrestling Machine", wearing a mouth guard and quickly squashing opponents. Upon coming to ECW, he issued an open challenge for ECW One Night Stand, which was accepted by Randy Orton. Angle defeated Orton at ECW One Night Stand, later losing to him in a rematch at Vengeance. On the June 27 episode of ECW, Angle challenged ECW World Heavyweight Champion Rob Van Dam to a title match, which he lost. Angle appeared sporadically on WWE television throughout mid-2006. On August 25, 2006, Angle was granted an early release from his WWE contract because of health reasons. Angle stated in the Kurt Angle: Champion documentary DVD that he asked for his release from WWE because he could not take time off and was working hurt, severely on some occasions. He also stated that when he quit, WWE lost their top talent, as he was at the very top of the payroll. Angle wrestled his last match at an ECW house show on August 14, where he defeated Danny Doring.

 Total Nonstop Action Wrestling (2006–2016) 
 The Angle Alliance (2006–2008) 

Angle then went on to sign a contract with Total Nonstop Action Wrestling (TNA).

Angle made his TNA debut on October 19 as a face, confronting Samoa Joe after Joe refused to relinquish the NWA World Heavyweight Championship belt that, according to the storyline, he had stolen from Jeff Jarrett. The two men ended up fighting while Jarrett took the title back. Angle was then the special enforcer for the title vs. career match between Jarrett and Sting at Bound for Glory; however, as part of the worked finish, he took out referee Rudy Charles and assumed the referee's role for the rest of the match-up. Angle's first match in TNA took place on the November 16 airing of Impact!, where he was booked to defeat Abyss with the ankle lock and be attacked after the match by Samoa Joe. At Genesis, Angle defeated Samoa Joe, ending Joe's undefeated streak.

At Final Resolution, Angle was booked to defeat Samoa Joe in a thirty-minute Iron Man match 3–2 to earn a shot at the NWA World Heavyweight Championship at Against All Odds, which he lost to Christian Cage after interference from Tomko and Scott Steiner. This led to a feud between Angle and Steiner, with Angle pinning Steiner at Destination X. After Angle defeated Steiner, he was picked to lead a team of four other wrestlers against a team of Christian Cage's choice in a Lethal Lockdown match at April's Lockdown. Angle chose Samoa Joe, Rhino, Sting, and Jeff Jarrett for Team Angle, while Cage chose A.J. Styles, Scott Steiner, Tomko, and Abyss. The man who gained the winning pinfall was to become the number one contender to Christian Cage's NWA World Heavyweight Championship. Team Angle was victorious after Jeff Jarrett hit Abyss with a gimmicked guitar full of thumbtacks and allowed Sting to score the pin. Cage was set to defend the NWA World Heavyweight Championship against Sting and Angle in a triple threat match at Sacrifice. The day of the pay-per-view, the National Wrestling Alliance (NWA), the owners of the NWA World Heavyweight and the NWA World Tag Team Championships, stripped Cage of the title and Team 3D of the tag team title. NWA Executive Director Robert K. Trobich stated the reason was that Cage refused to defend the NWA Title at NWA live events. At Sacrifice, Cage, still holding the physical NWA Championship belt, defended what was billed as the "World Heavyweight Championship" against Angle and Sting. Angle was the victor of said contest by making Sting submit, who had technically just pinned Cage, and was announced as the new "World Heavyweight Champion". The Impact! following the event, Angle came to the ring with a new championship belt, and announced he was the new "TNA World Heavyweight Champion". Afterward, Cage and Sting came to the ring and the three began to argue over who was the new TNA World Heavyweight Champion. Due to the controversial finish to their match at Sacrifice, the title was declared vacant by Cornette. A tournament was held for the title which culminated in a King of the Mountain match at Slammiversary on June 17, 2007. At Slammiversary, Angle became the TNA World Heavyweight Champion by defeating Cage, Samoa Joe, A.J. Styles, and Chris Harris. He then attacked Joe after denying a request for a handshake, reigniting their feud and turning heel in the process.

At Victory Road, newly crowned X Division Champion Samoa Joe teamed with Kurt Angle to face TNA Tag Team Champions Team 3D, with the stipulation that if a wrestler pinned the other opponent, he won his championship. As part of the planned outcome of the match, Joe pinned Brother Ray of Team 3D to win both tag team belts, which he held by himself. On the following episode of Impact!, Joe – now holding the X Division and TNA World Tag Team Championships, challenged Angle – the reigning TNA World Heavyweight and (IGF recognized) IWGP Heavyweight Champion, to a Winner Take All match at Hard Justice. While illustrating how he would take away everything important in Angle's life, Joe brought Angle's wife Karen into the fray, as she demanded a divorce. During the match at Hard Justice, however, Karen turned on Joe and aided Angle. As part of his next push, Angle won, gaining all the championships and becoming the second Triple Crown champion in TNA and the first to hold all three titles at the same time. Including the IWGP title, this made Angle a quadruple champion (and since Joe held the tag team titles by himself, that meant Angle's victory gave him both tag team championship belts, meaning Angle was now in possession of five championship belts). Angle, however, dropped both the X Division and Tag Team Championships to Jay Lethal and Team Pacman, respectively, at No Surrender. At Bound for Glory, Angle lost the TNA World Heavyweight Championship to Sting, but won it back on the October 25 episode of Impact!.

Angle then joined forces with A.J. Styles and Tomko as The Angle Alliance at Turning Point against Samoa Joe, Kevin Nash, and Scott Hall. Styles had planned for Christian's Coalition and The Angle Alliance to team up together, but Christian Cage demanded to be the leader of The Angle Alliance after Cage denied Angle's request of being his "lackey". At Final Resolution, Angle successfully defended the TNA World Heavyweight Championship against Cage due to interference from Styles and again at Against All Odds with help from Tomko. At Lockdown, Angle lost the TNA World Heavyweight Championship to Samoa Joe after being pinned.

 The Main Event Mafia (2008–2009) 

After suffering a neck injury, Angle was out of action. In the storyline, he returned to Impact! to ask his estranged wife Karen to reunite with him, but she declined his offer. Later that night, after Styles suffered a beating at the hands of Team 3D, Booker T, and Tomko, Angle added to the mugging by hitting Styles with a steel chair. At Slammiversary, Angle lost to Styles, being pinned after interference from Karen. At Victory Road, Angle and Team 3D won a six-man tag team Full Metal Mayhem match defeating the team of Christian Cage, Rhino, and Styles. At Hard Justice, Angle once again lost to Styles – this time in a Last Man Standing match. The feud continued on the next episode of Impact!, with Styles winning Angle's gold medal in a mock amateur wrestling match. The next week Angle challenged Styles to a ladder match for the Olympic gold medal. As they both stood on the top of the ladder, the arena went dark and Jeff Jarrett's music played. When the lights turned on, Styles had a guitar and performed an Acoustic Equalizer on Angle to win the match. Angle began a feud with Jarrett after No Surrender when Jarrett hit Angle with his guitar, a match that involved him, Christian Cage and Samoa Joe for the TNA World Heavyweight Championship. On the October 2 episode of Impact, Mick Foley announced that he was going to be the special enforcer for Angle's match with Jarrett at Bound for Glory IV. Angle lost to Jarrett in this match, being pinned after taking the mandible claw from Foley and a guitar shot and Stroke from Jarrett. He started attacking other superstars backstage in order to get a rematch against Jarrett. On the first HD Impact!, Angle, Booker T, Kevin Nash, and Sting started a new stable of legends called The Main Event Mafia. Scott Steiner joined the group the following week. Angle then defeated Abyss at Turning Point in a Falls Count Anywhere match. After weeks of torturing Jeff Jarrett to give him a rematch, Jarrett said that if Angle could defeat Rhino at the second Final Resolution of 2008, with Mick Foley as the Special Enforcer, he would grant it. Angle defeated Rhino to earn a rematch with Jarrett at Genesis after Al Snow made a surprise appearance and distracted Foley for Angle to cheat. At Sacrifice, Angle lost his leadership of the Mafia to Sting because of their match's stipulation. On June 21 at Slammiversary, Angle won the TNA World Heavyweight Championship for the fourth time in a King of the Mountain match with help from Samoa Joe. On the following episode of Impact!, Angle regained leadership of the Main Event Mafia after he and the rest of the Mafia, attacked Sting while introducing Joe as their newest member. At No Surrender, Angle lost his championship to A.J. Styles in a five-way match which also included Matt Morgan, Sting, and Hernandez.

 Various feuds (2009–2011) 
After defeating Morgan at Bound for Glory, Angle came out on the following episode of Impact! and put over the younger talent of the company, thus leaving the Main Event Mafia and turning face once again. Afterward, he was assaulted by the debuting Desmond Wolfe, who defeated him via knockout in a street fight the following week. At Turning Point Angle defeated Wolfe in a rematch. The following month at Final Resolution Angle faced Wolfe in a "Three Degrees of Pain" two out of three falls match. Wolfe managed to gain the first fall by pinning Angle following the Tower of London, but Angle forced him to submit with the ankle lock to win the second fall. In the final fall, which could only be won by escaping the Six Sides of Steel, Angle managed to escape first and won the match. On the January 4, 2010, live, three-hour, Monday night edition of Impact! Angle received a shot at A.J. Styles' World Heavyweight Championship, but was defeated in the main event of the show. Two weeks later at Genesis, Angle received one last shot at the TNA World Heavyweight Championship, but was once again defeated by Styles, who turned heel with the help of Ric Flair and nailed him with the title belt. As a result, Angle was barred from challenging for the title as long as Styles is the title holder. Due to the circumstances surrounding the loss, Hulk Hogan gave Angle another shot at Styles and the TNA World Heavyweight Championship on the January 21 episode of Impact!, but this time he lost the match after referee Earl Hebner, who was later revealed to have been paid off by Flair, called for the bell in an incident similar to the Montreal Screwjob. Angle responded to the incident by spitting in Hogan's face, threatening to quit TNA and go back to WWE. Angle apologized to Hogan, after being saved by him from Scott Hall and Syxx-Pac. At Against All Odds Angle took part in the 8 Card Stud Tournament to crown a new number one contender, but was defeated in the first round by Mr. Anderson, after Anderson used Angle's dog tags to bust him open. On the following episode of Impact! Angle promised to make Anderson suffer for disrespecting the U.S. soldiers, but was in the end once again laid out by him, effectively starting a feud between the two. At Destination X Angle defeated Anderson in a rematch. Angle and Anderson were booked in a rubber match inside a steel cage at Lockdown. On the April 5 episode of Impact!, Anderson defeated Angle in a ladder match to win possession of the key to the cage door. At Lockdown, Angle defeated Anderson in a steel cage match and afterwards announced that he would take some time off from wrestling.

Angle returned on the May 20 episode of Impact! and was ranked number two by the Championship Committee in the inaugural top 10 rankings for a World Heavyweight title shot. Angle, however, decided to take his name out of the running for a title shot and vowed to fight his way through the top 10 and earn his spot at the top of the company. At Slammiversary VIII Angle started his climb back to the top by defeating Kazarian, who was ranked number ten. Angle continued his climb, defeating Desmond Wolfe, who was ranked number nine prior to the match, on the June 24 episode of Impact!, and D'Angelo Dinero, ranked number eight, at Victory Road. Prior to his match with Dinero, Angle announced that should he lose on his way to the top of the rankings, he would retire from professional wrestling. On the July 22 episode of Impact! Angle defeated number seven ranked Hernandez and followed that up three weeks later by defeating number six ranked A.J. Styles. On the August 19 episode of Impact! the TNA World Heavyweight Championship was vacated and instead of continuing his climb, Angle was entered into an eight-man tournament for the title, defeating X Division Champion Douglas Williams in his first round match. At No Surrender Angle first wrestled Jeff Hardy to a twenty-minute time limit draw, after which Eric Bischoff ordered a five-minute extra time. After that and a second five-minute extra time also ended in draws, it was ruled that, due to a cut, Angle could not continue the match, ending the match in a no contest. After wrestling a draw on the September 16 episode of Impact!, it was announced that both Angle and Hardy had advanced to the finals at Bound for Glory, to wrestle Mr. Anderson in a three-way match.

At Bound for Glory, Angle was defeated by Hardy, when he turned heel and pinned Anderson after an interference from Hulk Hogan and Eric Bischoff, who then went on to form an alliance named Immortal, with Hardy, Abyss and Jeff Jarrett. On the following episode of Impact! Angle came out to make his retirement speech, after his failed attempt to win the TNA World Heavyweight Championship, but was interrupted by Jarrett, who announced that he had made a deal with Hogan and Bischoff in order to end Angle's career at Bound for Glory, before attacking him, when he was restrained by TNA's security officers Gunner and Murphy. The following week Angle returned, trying to get his hands on Bischoff and Ric Flair, before being stopped by TNA's security officers. Angle returned three weeks later on the November 11 episode of Impact!, saving Samoa Joe from Jeff Jarrett, Gunner and Murphy. After not appearing again for two weeks, Angle made another return on the December 2 episode of Impact!, saving Samoa Joe from Jeff Jarrett and Abyss. On the January 6, 2011 episode of Impact! Angle interrupted Jarrett's $100,000 Mixed Martial Arts Challenge and signed a contract to face him at Genesis in an MMA exhibition match, since he had promised not to wrestle again. The match was thrown out in the third round after Jarrett blinded Angle. After the match Jarrett bloodied Angle, before announcing that he was ending his mixed martial arts career and promised that his wife, Karen Jarrett (formerly Karen Angle), would join the retirement party. On the January 13 episode of Impact! Karen made her return and stopped Angle just as he was about to attack Jeff, telling him that she would not allow him to ruin their personal lives and promised to tell all about their divorce the following week. The following week Karen slapped Kurt, providing a distraction which allowed Jeff to beat him down. At the end of the show Crimson saved Angle from a beating at the hands of Immortal and Fortune. The following week Ric Flair reinstated Angle in order to place him and Crimson in a seven–on–two handicap match against Jarrett, James Storm, Robert Roode, Kazarian, Rob Terry, Gunner and Murphy. The match ended with Jarrett pinning Angle for the win. Afterwards, Angle was saved from another beatdown by the returning Scott Steiner. The following week Fortune turned on Immortal and aligned themselves with Angle, Crimson and Steiner. On February 13 at Against All Odds Jarrett defeated Angle in a singles match and as a result Angle was forced to walk Karen down the aisle, when she and Jarrett renewed their wedding vows on the March 3 episode of Impact!. After the match Angle hinted at a possible retirement by leaving his wrestling boots in the ring. On March 3, Angle proceeded to destroy the wedding set with an axe and forced wedding guest, New York Jet Bart Scott to submit with the ankle lock. On April 17 at Lockdown, Jarrett defeated Angle in an "Ultra Male Rules" two out of three falls steel cage match, with help from Karen. On the May 12 episode of Impact Wrestling, Angle revealed Chyna as his backup in taking care of the Jarretts. At Sacrifice, Angle and Chyna defeated the Jarretts in a mixed tag team match. Later that same month, Angle signed a new three-year contract with TNA. With Karen out of the picture, Angle defeated Jarrett on June 12 at Slammiversary IX in what was billed as the "final battle" between the two to retain his Olympic gold medal and become the number one contender for the TNA World Heavyweight Championship. However, on the following episode of Impact Wrestling, Jarrett challenged Angle to a Parking Lot Brawl and agreed to sign a contract that would force him to move to Mexico without Angle's children, should he lose the match. Angle ended up winning the fight after choking Jarrett with a shirt, forcing him to say "adiós".

 Immortal (2011–2012)  

With his feud with Jarrett behind him, Angle aligned himself with Sting to feud with the rest of Immortal, including the group's newest member, TNA World Heavyweight Champion Mr. Anderson. On the July 14 episode of Impact Wrestling, Angle helped Sting regain the TNA World Heavyweight Championship from Anderson. On August 7 at Hardcore Justice, Angle defeated Sting, after hitting him with a chair he snatched away from Hulk Hogan, to win the TNA World Heavyweight Championship for the record-breaking fifth time, thus turning heel in the process. On the following episode of Impact Wrestling, Angle explained that he did not agree with Sting, who, using the TNA World Heavyweight Championship, wanted to hand the promotion back to Dixie Carter, as he had found out that she had lied to him about not knowing of the relationship between Karen and Jeff Jarrett. When Sting confronted Angle, he was attacked by Hogan, which led to Angle revealing that Hogan had been the one who had exposed Carter's lie to him. Angle also revealed that his goal was now to ruin Carter's youth movement in TNA by eliminating the younger wrestlers one-by-one and started by attacking Bound for Glory Series leader Crimson after the main event, cementing his heel turn. Angle made his first televised title defense on the September 1 episode of Impact Wrestling, defeating Sting in a rematch, following interference from special enforcer Hulk Hogan and the rest of Immortal. The following week, Angle's title match with Mr. Anderson ended in a disqualification, following interference from Immortal, which led to a three-way match between Angle, Anderson and Sting on September 11 at No Surrender, where Angle managed to retain the title, following interference from Hogan. On October 16 at Bound for Glory, Angle successfully defended the title against Bobby Roode. On the following episode of Impact Wrestling, Angle lost the TNA World Heavyweight Championship to Roode's tag team partner, James Storm.

Angle returned on the November 17 episode of Impact Wrestling, attacking James Storm and revealing himself as the man who had attacked and bloodied him also the previous week, costing him his match with Bobby Roode for the TNA World Heavyweight Championship. On December 11 at Final Resolution, Angle was defeated by Storm in a singles match. On January 8, 2012, at Genesis, Angle defeated Storm in a rematch. On the following episode of Impact Wrestling, Storm defeated Angle in a number one contender's match. Angle returned on the February 16 episode of Impact Wrestling, costing Jeff Hardy his shot at the TNA World Heavyweight Championship. On March 18 at Victory Road, Angle defeated Hardy in a singles match, pinning him while grabbing a hold of the ring ropes. On April 15 at Lockdown, Hardy defeated Angle in a rematch, contested inside a steel cage. On the following episode of Impact Wrestling, Angle defeated A.J. Styles, following interference from Styles' rivals Christopher Daniels and Kazarian. The following week, Angle warned the two Immortal associates never to interfere in one of his matches again.

On May 13 at Sacrifice, Angle defeated Styles in a rematch, following another interference from Daniels and Kazarian. After the match, Angle made the save for Styles, chasing Daniels and Kazarian out of the ring. On June 10 at Slammiversary, Angle and Styles defeated Daniels and Kazarian to win the TNA World Tag Team Championship. On the following episode of Impact Wrestling, Angle entered the 2012 Bound for Glory Series, taking part in the opening gauntlet match, from which he was eliminated by Daniels. Two weeks later, Angle and Styles lost the TNA World Tag Team Championship back to Daniels and Kazarian. Angle wrestled his final match in the 2012 Bound for Glory Series on the August 30 episode of Impact Wrestling, losing to Jeff Hardy, which caused him to get eliminated from the tournament. On September 9 at No Surrender, Angle and Styles unsuccessfully challenged Daniels and Kazarian for the TNA World Tag Team Championships. Angle and Styles received another title shot against Daniels and Kazarian on October 14 at Bound for Glory, in a three-way match, which was won by Chavo Guerrero, Jr. and Hernandez. On the following episode of Impact Wrestling, Angle defeated Daniels and Styles in a three-way match to become one of four wrestlers in consideration for a shot at the TNA World Heavyweight Championship.

 New Main Event Mafia (2012–2013) 
The following week, Angle was chosen as the number one contender for the TNA World Heavyweight Championship, but was defeated by Jeff Hardy in his title match. Afterwards, Angle was attacked by Aces & Eights. At Turning Point, Angle defeated Aces & Eights member Devon via submission, despite the rest of Aces & Eights trying to interfere. Angle continued his feud with Aces & Eights on the December 6 episode of Impact Wrestling, defeating DOC via disqualification after the rest of Aces & Eights interfered. Three days later at Final Resolution, Angle teamed with Garett Bischoff, Samoa Joe, and Wes Brisco to defeat Devon, DOC, and two masked members of Aces & Eights in an eight-man tag team match. Angle unsuccessfully challenged Devon for the TNA Television Championship on the December 20 episode of Impact Wrestling, after interference from Aces & Eights, Garett Bischoff, Samoa Joe, and Wes Brisco. On the January 3, 2013, episode of Impact Wrestling, Angle and Samoa Joe defeated Devon and a masked member of Aces & Eights in a steel cage tag team match. Afterwards, the returning Sting saved Angle and Joe from a beatdown from Aces & Eights before revealing the mystery member as the debuting Mike Knox. The following week, Angle was sidelined with a storyline injury after Knox hit him in the neck with a ball-peen hammer. Angle returned to in-ring action on the January 31 Impact Wrestling, defeating Aces & Eights member Mr. Anderson in a steel cage match. Afterwards, Angle's two allies Garett Bischoff and Wes Brisco revealed themselves as members of Aces & Eights and attacked him. Angle infiltrated the Aces & Eights hideout on the February 28 Impact and managed to unmask their vice president, but was beat down by the other members before he could reveal his identity to the cameras. Angle revealed the Vice President as D'Lo Brown on the following episode of Impact. At Lockdown, Angle was defeated by Wes Brisco in a steel cage match, following interference from Brown. Angle was defeated by Jeff Hardy in a four-way number one contenders match for the TNA World Heavyweight Championship, which also included Magnus and Samoa Joe on the March 21 Impact Wrestling. In the following weeks, Angle continued to face Bischoff and Brisco in multiple tag team and handicap matches, that all ended with the two getting the advantage over Angle.

Angle then began feuding with A.J. Styles, after Styles refused to answer Angle's question on whether he is with TNA or the Aces & Eights which led to a brawl between the two on the May 9 episode of Impact Wrestling. On June 2 at Slammiversary XI, Angle was announced as the second inductee into the TNA Hall of Fame. Later that night, Angle defeated Styles in a singles match. On the following Impact Wrestling, Angle got into a verbal confrontation with the debuting Rampage Jackson who claimed he had to beat the best to be the best. The following week, Angle was defeated by Styles in a rematch to earn the final spot in the 2013 Bound for Glory Series. Afterward, Angle was assaulted by Aces & Eights until Jackson came out and made the save. On June 20 Angle attacked TNA World Heavyweight Champion Bully Ray at the end of the Impact Wrestling episode, and revealed himself as the first member of Sting's New Main Event Mafia. In the following weeks, Angle and Sting recruited Samoa Joe, Magnus, and Rampage Jackson as members of the New Main Event Mafia. Beginning on August 2, Angle took a hiatus from TNA after being admitted to rehab for drug and alcohol use.

 Director of Wrestling Operations (2013–2014) 
Angle returned on the October 10 episode of Impact Wrestling attacking EGO and challenged Bobby Roode to a match at Bound For Glory. The following week, Angle stated his discontentment with Roode mocking his Hall of Fame induction and told Roode he would make him tap out. Roode responded by attacking Angle with help from his faction, EGO, forcing Angle to submit to the crossface hold in a precursory act prior to their match. At the PPV Angle was inducted into the TNA Hall of Fame but he refused to accept the offer as he felt he had let himself, TNA and the fans down and didn't deserve a Hall of Fame induction ceremony. He also said he would accept the offer when he feels he has earned it and he still has great things to do in TNA. Later in that night, Angle was defeated by Roode, after he landed awkwardly from a running belly-to-belly suplex. On the October 31 episode of Impact Wrestling, Angle lied about gaining medical clearance as Angle suffered (kayfabe) convulsions during the match against Bobby Roode after a bad landing from the same move again, which resulted in referee Brian Hebner rewarding a knock out/count-out victory to Roode. After the match, he also showed signs of post-concussive amnesia. On November 5, Angle was reported to had tested negative for the concussion, but his recurring knee injuries still required monitoring. The following week, Angle saw the New Main Event Mafia being disbanded, then he was attacked by Roode after he accused him to use his injuries to get out of the match. On November 14, Angle won a submission match against Austin Aries in the World title tournament, but by using Roode's finisher: the arm trap crossface, with Roode watching on at the ramp. However, Angle lost his next match against Magnus due to an interference from Roode. At Final Resolution, Angle was defeated by Roode in a 2-out-of 3 falls match, but Angle beat Roode in a Steel Cage match at Genesis to end the feud.

On February 6, 2014, Angle had a match against Magnus. However, he won by disqualification, when EC3 attacked him performing a leglock, which injured his knee. On February 27, 2014, Angle officially accepted his induction into the TNA Hall of Fame, but the ceremony was interrupted by EC3, Angle attacked Ethan Carter III, on the next week, Angle was attacked by Ethan Carter III and severely damaged his knees, thus losing his chance to fight at Lockdown. Angle made his return on April 17, and vowing revenge. On April 24, after Angle defeated Rockstar Spud in a match, EC3 attacked Angle but Willow made the save. At Sacrifice Willow and Angle defeated Ethan Carter III and Rockstar Spud. In May, Angle underwent ACL repair surgery and was sidelined.

On June 20, 2014, Angle was named Executive Director of Wrestling Operations of TNA by TNA's board of directors. He announced a TNA World Heavyweight Championship rematch for the July 3 episode of Impact Wrestling between Lashley and Eric Young, and reinstated Bobby Roode, who had been indefinitely suspended by MVP. Angle also retired the TNA Television Championship, which had not been seen or defended since Abyss won it at Slammiversary 2013. On September 18, 2014 (aired on October 29 due to tape delay), Angle refereed the TNA World Heavyweight Championship between Bobby Roode and Bobby Lashley. Angle's contract with TNA was due to expire on September 14, 2014. Around this time he reached out to Vince McMahon to offer his services for a return to the WWE. Unbeknownst to him Triple H had taken over McMahon's former duties. Angle offered to return as a part-time wrestler due to concerns of his age and health. Angle was caught off guard when WWE declined his services. It is speculated that WWE only offered a full-time contract which Angle didn't accept or WWE declined his return due to past relationship issues with him. After he was denied by WWE, he quickly signed a part-time contract with TNA Wrestling. On September 21, 2014, Angle's contract with TNA expired, ending his eight-year tenure with the company. Angle teased a return to WWE, however, he was offered a full-time contract, so Angle decided to stay with TNA.

 Final feuds, world championship reign and departure (2015–2016) 

Angle returned to in-ring action on TNA's debut on Destination America on January 7, 2015, when he stopped a brawl, but started a street fight against MVP. On January 31, 2015 (aired March 20), Angle defeated Lashley to win the TNA World Heavyweight Championship for a record sixth time. He lost to Eric Young on May 1, at Hardcore Justice, in a stretcher match with the title not on the line. He successfully retained his title against Lashley once and then again against both Lashley and Eric Young. On May 8, Angle defeated Young to retain his title with Bully Ray as the special referee. On the May 29 episode of Impact Wrestling, he successfully retained his title once again against Eric Young, this time in a I Quit match. At Destination X, Angle defeated Rockstar Spud, who gave up the X Division Championship in order to challenge for the title. Later that night, Angle again successfully defended his title, this time against Austin Aries, who cashed in his Feast or Fired contract to allow him a title match. On the June 25, 2015 taping of Impact Wrestling (aired July 1), Angle lost the championship to Ethan Carter III. On the July 8 episode of Impact Wrestling, Angle faced Carter in a rematch in a losing effort.

On October 4, 2015, at Bound for Glory, Angle defeated Young via ankle lock submission. On November 19, 2015, Angle was announced for TNA's live debut on Pop. On the November 25, 2015 episode of Impact Wrestling, Angle announced that he would remain with TNA until the conclusion of their Maximum Impact Tour of the UK on January 31, 2016, after which he would part ways with the company. Angle announced his "Farewell Tour" which took place on TNA's tour of the UK. At TNA One Night Only: Live, Kurt Angle teamed with Drew Galloway in a three-way tag team match against Eli Drake and Jessie Godderz and The Wolves for their TNA World Tag Team Championship, in a losing effort. On the January 12 episode of Impact Wrestling, he defeated Drew Galloway. On the February 2 episode of Impact Wrestling, he challenged Matt Hardy for his TNA World Heavyweight Championship, but lost the match. On the February 9 episode of Impact Wrestling, he was defeated by Drew Galloway in their rematch. On the March 1 episode of Impact Wrestling, he defeated Bobby Roode. Angle's final match was against Lashley on March 8, 2016, which ended up in a losing effort.

 New Japan Pro-Wrestling (2007–2009) 
On February 18, 2007, Angle made his debut in New Japan Pro-Wrestling (NJPW), teaming with former IWGP Heavyweight Champion Yuji Nagata to defeat fellow TNA wrestler Travis Tomko and fellow WWE alumnus Giant Bernard.

Angle was booked to face Brock Lesnar in a champion versus champion match for the Inoki Genome Federation (IGF) on June 29, 2007, and defeated him by submission to win the IWGP Heavyweight Championship. Angle then challenged Lesnar to an MMA fight. On December 19, 2007, Angle defended the IWGP title successfully against Kendo Kashin.

On January 4, 2008, Angle made his third successful IWGP Heavyweight Championship defense when he defeated Yuji Nagata at the NJPW supershow Wrestle Kingdom II in Tokyo Dome by forcing Nagata to submit to the ankle lock. On February 17, 2008, Angle lost the IWGP title to the NJPW-recognized champion Shinsuke Nakamura in a unification match. He returned in August during the G1 Climax in two special tag matches with A.J. Styles as his main opponent. In those matches Shinsuke Nakamura and Masahiro Chono became Angle's partners while Hiroshi Tanahashi and Shinjiro Otani became Styles' partners. Angle's team won both matches.

He returned on January 4, 2009, at Wrestle Kingdom III in Tokyo Dome in a special eight-man tag match, where he, Kevin Nash, Chono, and Riki Choshu faced Great Bash Heel (Giant Bernard, Karl Anderson, Takashi Iizuka and Tomohiro Ishii), with Angle getting the win for his team. Angle then went on to defeat Bernard in a singles match at New Japan's ISM tour on February 15. After Hiroshi Tanahashi retained the IWGP Heavyweight Championship against Nakamura in the main event, Angle challenged him for the title, which Tanahashi accepted. Tanahashi defeated Angle on April 5 at New Japan's Resolution '09 to retain the title.

 Lucha Libre AAA Worldwide (2012) 
Angle made his debut for Mexican promotion Lucha Libre AAA Worldwide (AAA) on August 5, 2012, at Triplemanía XX, where he teamed up with Jeff Jarrett as Team Dorian Roldán in a hair vs. hair match, where they faced Team Joaquín Roldán (Electroshock and L.A. Park), with the Roldáns' hairs on the line. Electroshock won the match for his team by pinning Angle, forcing Dorian to have his head shaved bald. However, after the match, Angle, Jarrett and Dorian overpowered the winners and shaved Joaquín bald.

 Independent circuit (2016–2017) 
On March 20, 2016, Angle competed for URFight, going against former rival and fellow WWE alumnus Rey Mysterio in a losing effort in a two-falls match that saw Angle as a heel by using dirty tactics. Angle wrestled for Revolution Pro Wrestling on June 12, where he defeated Zack Sabre Jr. On August 27, Angle lost to Cody Rhodes at Northeast Wrestling's Wrestling Under the Stars on August 27 in Wappingers Falls, New York. Angle defeated Joe Hendry at the October 6 What Culture Pro Wrestling tapings. On November 20, 2016, Angle lost to Joe Coffey at Insane Championship Wrestling's Fear & Loathing IX. On February 12, 2017, Angle defeated Alberto el Patrón at WCPW True Destiny in his final match in the United Kingdom.

On March 3, 2017, Angle appeared for Northeast Wrestling in Connecticut, where he was defeated by Cody Rhodes in a steel cage match. This was his last match on the independent circuit.

 Return to WWE 

 WWE Hall of Famer and Raw General Manager (2017–2018) 

On January 16, 2017, WWE announced that Angle would be inducted into the WWE Hall of Fame. On March 16, WWE revealed that his long-time rival John Cena would induct Angle at the Hall of Fame ceremony. On the April 3 episode of Raw after WrestleMania 33, Angle made his first WWE appearance in nearly 11 years after Mr. McMahon appointed Angle as the new general manager of Raw. On the May 29 episode of Raw, commentator Corey Graves informed Angle about some "scandalous information" that was sent to him about Angle, with Angle telling Graves "if this is true, it could ruin me". On the July 17 episode of Raw, Angle revealed that he had a son with a woman he dated in college. He stated that his son eventually ended up in the WWE. Angle then made the announcement that his (on-screen) son was Jason Jordan of American Alpha, thus moving Jordan to the Raw brand.

On October 20, WWE announced Angle's in-ring return after 11 years, replacing Roman Reigns due to medical issues and teaming with Dean Ambrose and Seth Rollins to face The Miz, Braun Strowman, Kane, Cesaro and Sheamus in a 5-on-3 handicap Tables, Ladders, and Chairs match at TLC: Tables, Ladders & Chairs. Angle (dressed in The Shield's ring attire), Ambrose, and Rollins won the match, despite Angle having initially been taken out when Braun Strowman executed a Running Powerslam through a table on Angle. On the October 30 episode of Raw, while addressing the fans, commissioner Stephanie McMahon confronted Angle, announcing that Angle would be the team captain of Team Raw at Survivor Series, adding that if Team Raw would lose, Angle would be fired. At the event, Angle's teammate Triple H attacked him, leading to his elimination by Shane McMahon, however, Team Raw still went on to win the match. At the Elimination Chamber, Angle, along with Stephanie McMahon and Triple H, was present when Ronda Rousey signed her Raw contract, where Angle brought up the confrontation that Stephanie McMahon and Triple H had with Rousey and The Rock at WrestleMania 31 and that they both want to manipulate her. This caused Rousey to put Triple H through a table and be slapped by Stephanie McMahon before signing her contract. The following night on Raw, Angle claimed the allegations he made were false to keep his job before being attacked by Triple H. As a result, the following week, Angle scheduled himself to team with Rousey against Triple H and Stephanie McMahon in a mixed tag team match at WrestleMania 34, which Angle and Rousey won. Angle participated in the 50-man Royal Rumble match at the Greatest Royal Rumble event later that month. He entered at number 16 and eliminated Bo Dallas, Primo Colón and Dolph Ziggler before being eliminated by Elias. Following WrestleMania, Angle found himself in a power struggle over the control of Raw, when the McMahon family appointed Baron Corbin as the constable of Monday Nights on the June 4 episode of Raw. This continued until the August 20 episode of Raw, when Stephanie McMahon sent Angle on "vacation" before announcing that Corbin would be acting general manager in Angle's absence.

 Final matches and retirement (2018–2019) 
On the October 8 episode of Raw, Angle made a surprise return, disguised under a mask as "The Conquistador", winning a battle royal after last eliminating Baron Corbin and qualifying for the WWE World Cup at Crown Jewel. At the event, Angle was defeated by Dolph Ziggler in the first round of the WWE World Cup Tournament. On November 5, Angle competed in his first match on Raw since 2006, for a spot in the Survivor Series, losing to Drew McIntyre in dominating fashion, with McIntyre using Angle's own ankle lock finishing maneuver to make him submit. Angle returned at TLC on December 16 to help Braun Strowman, along with Apollo Crews, Finn Bálor, Bobby Roode, Chad Gable, and referee Heath Slater, beat Baron Corbin to strip him of authoritative power. The next night on Raw, Angle along with Crews, Roode and Gable, easily defeated Corbin in a handicapped-no disqualification match to prevent him from being the permanent general manager of Raw. At the 2019 Royal Rumble on January 27, 2019, Angle entered the match at number four but was eliminated by Shinsuke Nakamura.

On the March 11 episode of Raw, Angle announced he would retire at WrestleMania 35 and chose Baron Corbin as his final opponent at the event. Over the following weeks, Angle embarked on a "Farewell Tour", facing several handpicked opponents, including Apollo Crews, Chad Gable, Samoa Joe and AJ Styles. At WrestleMania 35, Angle lost to Corbin in his final match.  On the Raw after WrestleMania, Angle attacked Corbin, and was subsequently attacked by a debuting Lars Sullivan. Afterwards, Angle transitioned to a backstage role as a producer.

 Sporadic appearances (2019–present) 

On July 22, Angle appeared on Raw Reunion and raised a toast alongside Triple H, Ric Flair, Hulk Hogan, Stone Cold Steve Austin and various other fellow wrestlers of his era. On the August 5 episode of Raw in his hometown of Pittsburgh, Angle made an appearance as the special guest referee for a match between Drew McIntyre and Cedric Alexander. However, McIntyre and Alexander took out each other before the match began and Angle was then attacked by "The Fiend" Bray Wyatt. On April 15, 2020, Angle was released from his WWE contract as part of budget cuts stemming from the COVID-19 pandemic.

On the May 27 episode of NXT, Angle served as the special guest referee in a steel cage match between Matt Riddle and Timothy Thatcher. He appeared again two days later on the May 29 episode of SmackDown to announce the arrival of Matt Riddle to the brand. In an interview with CBR, Angle revealed that WWE offered him a new deal to come back under the role of Matt Riddle's manager but he turned it down in order to focus on his health and his nutrition business.

On the June 27, 2022 episode of Raw, Angle made an appearance via a video message to congratulate John Cena on his 20-year career.

Angle would appear on the August 29 episode of Raw, which took place in his hometown of Pittsburgh, sporting his old Team Angle attire. He would get into an altercation with  Alpha Academy (Chad Gable and Otis) before being aided by the Street Profits (Angelo Dawkins and Montez Ford), which led to a tag team match between the two teams with the stipulation that if Alpha Academy won, Angle would have to join them. The Street Profits would win the match and afterwards, Angle celebrated with them by drinking milk. Later on in the night, Angle reunited with Edge backstage and would get pranked by him with rigged pictures containing mocking slogans on the back of them in a similar fashion to a segment the duo had back in 2002.

Angle made his next appearance on the December 9 episode of SmackDown, where he celebrated his 54th birthday. He interacted with various superstars backstage including his storyline son, Jason Jordan, before once again getting into an altercation with Alpha Academy at the end of the show during his in-ring celebration. Angle would be aided by Gable Steveson, who drove a milk truck to the ring and the two sprayed Alpha Academy with milk from a hose mimicking Angle's famous 2001 segment. After the show went off the air, Rey Mysterio led the superstars and audience in singing "Happy Birthday" to Angle.

On Raw is XXX on January 23, 2023, Angle appeared in a segment with D-Generation X (Triple H, Shawn Michaels, Road Dogg and X-Pac) before serving as the special guest referee in a six-man tag team match involving The Street Profits and Seth Rollins against Imperium (Gunther, Ludwig Kaiser and Giovanni Vinci) which the former team won.

Return to Impact Wrestling (2022)
At Slammiversary on June 19, 2022, Angle returned to Impact Wrestling in a video message to congratulate Impact on their 20 years.

 Professional wrestling style and persona 

When Angle begun to train as a professional wrestler, he was asked to not watch old tapes, since the style changed during the Attitude Era and the matches were more aggressive. Instead, he learned watching then-current wrestlers like Steve Austin, Triple H or The Rock. Angle said his match against The Rock at No Way Out 2001 was the transition between the "funny, goofy Kurt Angle to a more serious competitor", including more offense.

Angle's Olympic gold medal has frequently been incorporated into his professional wrestling persona. His personality varies depending on his alignment as a face or heel. As a face, Angle usually performs as a role model, but as a heel, arrogantly uses his achievements to insult other people. He mixes aspects from his amateur wrestling background into his in-ring work, performing various suplexes, including the belly-to-back, German or Overhead belly-to-belly, as well as submissions, such as the Rear naked choke or the Triangle choke. He primarily performs two finishing maneuvers to end his matches: an Olympic slam, dubbed "Angle Slam" and an ankle lock.

During Angle's entrance, it is common for fans to chant "You Suck!" to the tune of his entrance music. The chants originated during Angle's feud with The Rock in February 2001, but gained popularity during his feud with Edge in 2002. The chants have become a trademark of Angle's persona, regardless if he is a face or heel.

Other media
Angle appeared in every WWE/F video game from 2000's WWF Royal Rumble up to WWE SmackDown vs. Raw 2007, released in 2006. After an eleven-year absence, Angle made his return to WWE video games as a playable character in WWE 2K18 (as downloadable content), before subsequently appearing in WWE 2K19, WWE 2K20 and returning in WWE 2K23. He also appears in TNA Impact!, TNA Wrestling and TNA Wrestling Impact!.

 Acting career 
Angle has expressed interest in pursuing an acting career after retiring from professional wrestling. In 2008, he made his film debut as a racist prison deputy in the short film Chains. In 2009, he played serial killer Brad Mayfield in the film End Game. On a third-season episode of Pros vs. Joes, he was teamed up with Jimmy Smith and Kendall Gill against the Joes. Angle appeared in the "Car Wreck Vanish" episode of Criss Angel Mindfreak. He played Russian MMA champion Koba (in a non-speaking role) in the 2011 film Warrior, and starred as town sheriff Will Logan in the film River of Darkness.

On the Right After Wrestling program on Sirius Satellite Radio, Angle revealed he would become a part-time wrestler after his contract expired in 2011 to focus on Angle Foods and his acting career. In the 2013 film Pro Wrestlers vs Zombies, he plays himself as both a human and a zombie. Angle also had a small role in the 2014 cult-film Sharknado 2: The Second One and in the 2014 romantic-comedy film Not Cool. He appeared in the film The Last Witch Hunter. He also made a cameo appearance in the movie Pain and Gain in which he brawls against Dwayne Johnson's character in a prison fight. Angle appeared on an episode of Duck Dynasty in February 2016.

 Filmography 

 Other endeavors 
In 1996, Angle became a marketing representative for Protos Foods, the manufacturers of OSTRIM, an ostrich-meat-based foodstuff. In 1997, he worked for a year as a sportscaster on Pittsburgh's local Fox affiliate WPGH-TV. He also did a commercial for Pittsburgh-based pizza chain Pizza Outlet. Both Angle's pizza commercial and his time on WPGH-TV would be referenced on WWE television (the latter through the WWE Network show Ride Along), and his time with WPGH-TV would also make him an alumnus of WPGH-TV parent Sinclair Broadcast Group without having ever appeared for Sinclair-owned wrestling promotion Ring of Honor.

Angle is a longtime fan of MMA, and has occasionally talked about his desire to compete. UFC president Dana White stated that Angle was in talks to appear as a heavyweight contestant on the 10th season of The Ultimate Fighter, but failed the medical requirements. Angle signed with Bellator MMA on October 28, 2015. He attended a fan convention on November 6, the eve of Bellator 145, then joined the commentary booth the next night, during the Bobby Lashley vs. James Thompson match, where he teased possibly fighting for the promotion himself.

Angle's book, It's True It's True, was released on September 18, 2001. In 2008, Angle was selected to be featured on the cover for metal band Emmure's second album The Respect Issue where he is depicted on the front and back covers for the record, as well as in the inlay.

Angle began hosting a podcast called The Kurt Angle Show with Conrad Thompson in 2021.

 Personal life 

Angle married Karen Smedley on December 19, 1998, In September 2008, it was reported that Karen had filed for divorce from Kurt. They have two children together.

In 2010, it was reported that Angle was engaged to actress Giovanna Yannotti. They have three children (one adopted). Angle and Yannotti were married on July 20, 2012.

Angle is a Christian. He supported Marco Rubio in the 2016 Republican Party presidential primaries. He is a supporter of the Pittsburgh Steelers and Pittsburgh Penguins.

In July 2015, Angle underwent emergency surgery to remove fluid buildup on his spinal cord after all of his extremities went numb. A week before this emergency, he had surgery to remove a benign tumor from his neck.

 Steroid use 
On March 6, 2007, Sports Illustrated reported that Angle's name was found in the client database of a Florida wellness center suspected of being a front for distributing performance enhancing drugs. The magazine alleged that Angle had received prescriptions for trenbolone (which is not approved for human use by the FDA) and nandrolone, both anabolic steroids. Angle responded on his official website: "I did not improperly receive prescriptions. It is well documented that in my career I have broken vertebrae in my neck on five occasions and each time the course of treatment was under the care and supervision of my doctors. Any attempt to link me to the athletes in the current news accounts who may have improperly sought performance-enhancing drugs is without foundation". Angle never failed a drug test for pain pills, but he did fail a steroid test under WWE's Wellness Policy because his prescription for nandrolone had expired.

 Substance abuse 
Angle has been open about struggles with addiction to prescription pain medication. Angle claims that he developed an addiction to pain killers after suffering a broken neck in 2003, and that his addictions got so out of control that at one point, he was taking up to 65 extra-strength Vicodin per day. Angle states that after completing rehabilitation following a 2013 DUI arrest, he has been clean and sober ever since.

 Legal issues 
In September 2007, Angle was arrested by the Moon Township Police Department  in Moon Township, Pennsylvania on a DUI charge after police received a report of an erratic driver leaving a local bar. Angle was charged with driving under the influence and careless driving after police traced the description of the car to his home. Angle was later found not guilty on those charges when the complaining witness was unable to corroborate her story.

On August 15, 2009, Angle was again arrested by the Moon Township Police Department in Moon Township, Pennsylvania that is part of Greater Pittsburgh area. His girlfriend stated that she had filed a protection from abuse (PFA) order and that he was stalking her in the Robinson area. Angle was charged with "driving while operating privilege is suspended, prohibited acts-possession, harassment and prohibited acts". Hygetropin, a human growth hormone, was found in his car; Angle maintained that he had a prescription for the drug. On September 15, a District Court judge dropped the harassment, suspended license, and drug charges against Angle. On November 9, 2009, the PFA charges were dropped after he and former girlfriend Trenesha Biggers reached an agreement to avoid contact with each other.

On March 25, 2011, Angle was arrested by North Dakota Highway Patrol officers in Thompson, North Dakota, and charged with "being in control of a motor vehicle while intoxicated" after failing a field sobriety test. Angle later pleaded guilty to the charges and was sentenced on April 20 to one year of unsupervised probation, a chemical dependency evaluation, a $250 fine, $225 in court fees, and a ten-day suspended sentence.

Angle was arrested on September 4, 2011, by Virginia State Troopers for allegedly driving under the influence. Angle was placed in Warren County Jail, before posting $2,000 bail and being released in the early morning. State police revealed that Angle's initial breath test at the scene, where he was stopped by police, showed a blood-alcohol concentration of 0.091 percent, which was above the legal limit of 0.08 percent. The test was later ruled not admissible and when a second test, taken at the police station, showed a blood-alcohol concentration of 0.06, the DUI charge was dropped. Angle was still charged with reckless driving. On November 8, 2011, Angle entered a plea of no contest and was fined $1,500.

On August 2, 2013, Angle was arrested by Texas Highway Patrol officers and again charged with driving while intoxicated in Decatur, Texas. Later that same day, Angle announced he was immediately entering a rehabilitation center.

 Championships and accomplishments 
 Folkstyle/freestyle wrestling 

 Canadian Cup Championship
 Winner (1990)
 Collegiate/High School
 Clarion University Freshman of the Year (1988)
 Pennsylvania State Wrestling Champion (1987)
 International Federation of Associated Wrestling Styles
 FILA Junior World Freestyle Champion (1988)
 FILA World Championships gold medal in freestyle wrestling (100 kg) (1995)
 International Sports Hall of Fame
 Class of 2016
 National Amateur Wrestling Hall of Fame
 National Wrestling Hall of Fame Distinguished Member (Class of 2001)
 National Collegiate Athletic Association
 NCAA Division I All-American (1990–1992)
 NCAA Division I Heavyweight Champion (1990, 1992)
 Olympic Games
 Summer Olympics gold medal in freestyle wrestling (heavyweight) (1996)
 USA Wrestling
 USA Junior Freestyle Champion (1987)
 USA Senior Freestyle Champion (1995, 1996)
 USA Wrestling Hall of Fame (Class of 2001)

 Professional wrestling 

 The Baltimore Sun Best Worker of the Decade (2010)
 Cauliflower Alley Club Future Legend Award (2000)
 Inoki Genome Federation IWGP Heavyweight Championship (1 time)
 George Tragos/Lou Thesz Professional Wrestling Hall of Fame Class of 2012
 Special honoree (2015)Memphis Wrestling Hall of FameClass of 2021
 Power Pro Wrestling PPW Heavyweight Championship (1 time)
 Pro Wrestling Illustrated Comeback of the Year (2003)
 Feud of the Year (2000) 
 Feud of the Year (2003) 
 Feud of the Year (2007) 
 Inspirational Wrestler of the Year (2001)
 Match of the Year (2003) 
 Match of the Year (2005) 
 Most Hated Wrestler of the Year (2000)
 Most Popular Wrestler of the Year (2003)
 Rookie of the Year (2000)
 Wrestler of the Year (2003)
 Ranked No. 1 of the top 500 singles wrestlers in the PWI 500 in 2001
 SoCal Uncensored Match of the Year (2000) 
 Total Nonstop Action Wrestling TNA World Heavyweight Championship (6 times)
 TNA World Tag Team Championship (2 times) – with Sting (1) and A.J. Styles (1)
 TNA X Division Championship (1 time)
 King of the Mountain (2007, 2009)
 Second TNA Triple Crown Champion
 TNA Hall of Fame (2013)
TNA Year End Awards (5 times)
Who to Watch in 2007 (2006)
Memorable Moment of the Year (2006) 
Feud of the year (2006, 2007) 
Match of the Year (2007) 
 Wrestling Observer Newsletter Best Gimmick (2000)
 Best on Interviews (2002)
 Best Technical Wrestler (2002)
 Feud of the Year (2003) 
 Match of the Year (2002) 
 Most Improved (2000)
 Most Outstanding Wrestler (2001–2003)
 Readers' Favorite Wrestler (2002–2003)
 Wrestler of the Year (2002)
 Wrestler of the Decade (2000–2009)
 Wrestling Observer Newsletter Hall of Fame (Class of 2004)
 WWE/World Wrestling Entertainment/Federation'''
 WCW Championship (1 time)
 WCW United States Championship (1 time)
 World Heavyweight Championship (1 time)
 WWF/WWE Championship (4 times)
 WWE Tag Team Championship (1 time, inaugural) – with Chris Benoit
 WWF European Championship (1 time)
 WWF Hardcore Championship (1 time)
 WWF Intercontinental Championship (1 time)
 Fifth Grand Slam Champion
 King of the Ring (2000)
 10th Triple Crown Champion
 WWE Tag Team Championship Tournament (2002) – with Chris Benoit
 WWE Hall of Fame (Class of 2017)

World Championships/Olympic Games matches 

|-
!Res.
!Record
!Opponent
!Score
!Date
!Event
!Location
|-
! style=background:white colspan=7 |
|-
|Win
|style="text-align:center;"|9–0
|align=left| Abbas Jadidi
|style="font-size:88%"|1–1
|style="font-size:88%" rowspan=3|July 31, 1996
|style="font-size:88%" rowspan=5|1996 Olympic Games
|style="text-align:left;font-size:88%;" rowspan=5| Atlanta, Georgia
|-
|Win
|style="text-align:center;"|8–0
|align=left| Konstantin Aleksandrov
|style="font-size:88%"|4–1
|-
|Win
|style="text-align:center;"|7–0
|align=left| Sagid Murtazaliev
|style="font-size:88%"|4–3
|-
|Win
|style="text-align:center;"|6–0
|align=left| Wilfredo Morales
|style="font-size:88%"|2–0
|style="font-size:88%" rowspan=2|July 30, 1996
|-
|Win
|style="text-align:center;"|5–0
|align=left| Dolgorsürengiin Sumyaabazar 
|style="font-size:88%"|4–0
|-
! style=background:white colspan=7 |
|-
|Win
|style="text-align:center;"|4–0
|align=left| Arawat Sabejew 
|style="font-size:88%"|Referee Decision
|style="font-size:88%" rowspan=4|August 13, 1995
|style="font-size:88%" rowspan=4|1995 World Championships
|style="text-align:left;font-size:88%;" rowspan=4| Atlanta, Georgia
|-
|Win
|style="text-align:center;"|3–0
|align=left| Oleg Ladik 
|style="font-size:88%"|Referee Decision
|-
|Win
|style="text-align:center;"|2–0
|align=left| Josef Glazer
|style="font-size:88%"|3–0
|-
|Win
|style="text-align:center;"|1–0
|align=left| Kenan Şimşek 
|style="font-size:88%"|2–0

Luchas de Apuestas record

Notes

References

Sources

External links 

 Kurt Angle at The National Wrestling Hall of Fame website
 
 
 
 
 
 
 TNA Impact Wrestling Profile

1968 births
20th-century professional wrestlers
21st-century American male actors
21st-century professional wrestlers
American autobiographers
American male professional wrestlers
American male sport wrestlers
American podcasters
American sportspeople convicted of crimes
Christians from Pennsylvania
Clarion Golden Eagles wrestlers
Clarion University of Pennsylvania alumni
Expatriate professional wrestlers in Japan
Expatriate professional wrestlers in Mexico
Impact Hall of Fame inductees
IWGP Heavyweight champions
Living people
Male actors from Pennsylvania
Medalists at the 1996 Summer Olympics
NWA/WCW/WWE United States Heavyweight Champions
Olympic gold medalists for the United States in wrestling
Professional wrestling authority figures
Professional wrestling podcasters
Professional wrestling referees
Professional wrestlers from Pennsylvania
Sportspeople from Mt. Lebanon, Pennsylvania
Sportspeople from Pittsburgh
TNA/Impact World Tag Team Champions
TNA/Impact X Division Champions
TNA World Heavyweight/Impact World Champions
WCW World Heavyweight Champions
World Heavyweight Champions (WWE)
World Wrestling Champions
Wrestlers at the 1996 Summer Olympics
WWE Champions
WWE Grand Slam champions
WWF European Champions
WWE Hall of Fame inductees
WWF/WWE Hardcore Champions
WWF/WWE Intercontinental Champions
WWF/WWE King Crown's Champions/King of the Ring winners